Since the Nashville Sounds Minor League Baseball team was established in Nashville, Tennessee, in 1978, its pitchers have pitched seven no-hitters, which include two perfect games. A no-hit game occurs when a pitcher (or pitchers) allows no hits over the course of a game. A perfect game, a much rarer feat, occurs when no batters reach base by a hit or any other means, such as a walk, hit by pitch, or error.

Nashville's seven no-hitters were accomplished by a total of twelve pitchers. Five were complete games pitched by a lone pitcher, and two were combined no-hitters. One occurred while the team was a member of the Double-A Southern League, two while in the Triple-A American Association, and four in the Triple-A Pacific Coast League. Five were pitched at the Sounds' first home ballpark, Herschel Greer Stadium, where the team played from 1978 to 2014. None have been pitched at First Horizon Park, where they have played since 2015. Two were pitched in road games.

History

The Sounds' first no-hitter was Jim Deshaies' 5–1 win over the Columbus Astros on May 4, 1984, at Herschel Greer Stadium in Nashville, Tennessee. In the second inning, Deshaies walked three batters and hit another, accounting for the only Astros run of the game, the second game of a seven-inning doubleheader. Deshaies struck out eight batters including Ty Gainey for the final out. Their second no-hitter was thrown by Bryan Kelly on July 17, 1985, against the Oklahoma City 89ers at Greer Stadium. The no-hit bid was nearly broken up in the eighth inning when Nick Capra executed a swinging bunt down the first base line, but first baseman Mike Laga fielded the ball and tossed it to Kelly who rushed to step on first for the out.

Jack Armstrong tossed the club's third no-hitter on August 7, 1988, versus the Indianapolis Indians in Nashville. He finished one base runner shy of perfection after Razor Shines reached on a walk in the fourth inning. Second baseman Lenny Harris backed-up Armstrong in the fifth when he ran down a sharply-hit grounder and made an off-balance throw to get Jack Daugherty out at first. Harris also made significant contributions to the previous night's game in which Indians pitchers Randy Johnson and Pat Pacillo pitched a no-hit game against the Sounds, but lost. That game was won by Nashville when Harris walked to first base, stole second base, stole third base, and then came home, scoring on a groundout.

On April 7, 2003, John Wasdin pitched a perfect game against the Albuquerque Isotopes at Greer. Third baseman Mike Gulan made two critical defensive plays to keep the perfect game bid intact. The first was the barehanded-fielding of Jesus Medrano's bunt in the top of the fourth inning, which he threw to first baseman Adam Hyzdu to get Medrano out by a step. The other came in the top of the ninth as Gulan made a backhanded catch of Matt Treanor's sharply-hit line drive for the inning's first out. Only the next-to-last hitter, Matt Erickson, worked the count full before striking out swinging on a curveball. Wasdin completed the game by striking out the final batter, pinch hitter Rob Stratton. In all, Wasdin threw 100 pitches, striking out 15 batters. This was the second nine-inning complete perfect game in Pacific Coast League history.

The Sounds' first combined no-hitter occurred on July 15, 2006, in Nashville, when pitchers Carlos Villanueva (6 IP), Mike Meyers (2 IP), and Alec Zumwalt (1 IP) no-hit the Memphis Redbirds. Villanueva, working under a limit of 90 pitches in his Triple-A debut, was relieved by Meyers at the start of the seventh inning, and Zumwalt came in for the save in the ninth working a 1-2-3 inning and striking out Jason Conti on a checked swing.

Manny Parra pitched the franchise's second perfect game on June 25, 2007, against the Round Rock Express at the Dell Diamond in Round Rock, Texas, making it the first Sounds no-hitter in a road game. Only two Express players managed to work the count full: Jason Lane and Cody Ransom. Otherwise, Parra experienced little difficulty in retiring hitters. The last batter of the game was pinch hitter Jesse Garcia, who popped out to Brad Nelson at first. Parra threw 107 pitches and struck out 11 hitters to record the third nine-inning complete perfect game in Pacific Coast League history.

Most recently, Chris Smith (6 IP), Sean Doolittle (1 IP), Tucker Healy (1 IP), and Simón Castro (1 IP) pitched a combined no-hitter on June 7, 2017, versus the Omaha Storm Chasers at Werner Park in Papillion, Nebraska. The 36-year-old Smith pitched six scoreless innings before being relieved by a trio of pitchers including Doolittle, who was with the team on a major league rehab assignment.

No-hitters

See also
List of American Association no-hitters
List of Pacific Coast League no-hitters

References

No-hitters
Nashville Sounds no-hitters